The 1938 Villanova Wildcats football team represented Villanova College as an independent during the 1938 college football season. The Wildcats were led by third-year head coach Maurice J. "Clipper" Smith and played their home games at Villanova Stadium in Villanova, Pennsylvania.

Schedule

References

Villanova
Villanova Wildcats football seasons
College football undefeated seasons
Villanova Wildcats football